Diapterus is a genus of fish in the family Gerreidae, the mojarras. They are native to the Atlantic and Pacific coasts of the Americas.

Species
The currently recognized species in this genus are:
 Diapterus auratus Ranzani, 1842 (Irish mojarra)
 Diapterus brevirostris (Sauvage, 1879) (Shortnose mojarra) 
 Diapterus peruvianus (G. Cuvier, 1830) (Peruvian mojarra)
 Diapterus rhombeus (G. Cuvier, 1829) (Caitipa mojarra)

References

Gerreidae
Marine fish genera
Taxa named by Camillo Ranzani